Jingxiu District (formerly（before 2015 May） Xinshi District, is a district of Baoding, Hebei, China.

Administrative Divisions
Subdistricts:
Xianfeng Subdistrict, Xinshichang Subdistrict, Dongfenglu Subdistrict, Jiannan Subdistrict, North Hancun Road Subdistrict
Towns:
Dajidian Town, Yimuquan Town()
Townships:
Jiezhuang Township, Fuchang Township, Hancun Township, Damafang Township

References

 
County-level divisions of Hebei
Geography of Baoding